Denny Hall is a building on the main campus of the University of Washington, in Seattle, Washington, United States. Built between 1894 and 1895, it is named after Arthur A. Denny.

Design
Denny Hall was designed by Charles Saunders and constructed between 1894 and 1895. The brick and sandstone, French Renaissance Revival building is the oldest on the University of Washington's current campus. A grassy area planted with large, canopy trees - the Denny Yard - sits in front of the building.

History

The cornerstone of the building was laid in a July 1894 ceremony attended by a crowd of about 1,000. Originally called the Administration Building, in 1910 it was renamed after Arthur A. Denny, one of the founders of Seattle and an early benefactor of the university. The building was renovated, first in 1957, and a second time beginning in 2008. The $56 million renovation of 2008 was stalled by the recession of 2008 but resumed in 2014 and was completed two years later.

An engraving of Denny Hall is featured on the University of Washington's mace, which is carried and displayed by the Marshal of the University during Convocation and Commencement ceremonies.

From 1961 until his death in 2013, Brewster Denny was responsible for the annual ringing of the Varsity Bell.

As of 2016, the building houses the university's departments of Anthropology, Classics, Germanics and Near Eastern Languages & Civilization.

Notes

References

External links

1890s architecture in the United States
1895 establishments in Washington (state)
Buildings and structures in Seattle
Educational buildings
University of Washington campus
School buildings completed in 1895